Thomas O'Neil (24 July 1936 – 29 November 2018) was a New Zealand cricketer. He played in one first-class match for Wellington in 1965/66.

See also
 List of Wellington representative cricketers

References

External links
 

1936 births
2018 deaths
New Zealand cricketers
Wellington cricketers
Cricketers from Wellington City